The Napaaktoktok River is a waterway in the Kitikmeot region of Nunavut in Canada. It flows generally north to Coronation Gulf, an arm of the Arctic Ocean. The Napaaktoktok runs parallel to the Coppermine River,  to the west, and the Asiak River,  to the east.

See also
List of rivers of Nunavut

References

Rivers of Kitikmeot Region